This is a list of all personnel changes for the 1957 NBA off-season and 1957-58 NBA season.

Events

August 15, 1957
 The Syracuse Nationals sold George King to the Cincinnati Royals.

September 12, 1957
 The Minneapolis Lakers traded Walter Dukes to the Detroit Pistons for Larry Foust.

October 10, 1957
 The Philadelphia Warriors sold Larry Costello to the Syracuse Nationals.

November 7, 1957
 The Cincinnati Royals signed Monk Meineke as a free agent.

December 10, 1957
 The Cincinnati Royals sold Tom Marshall to the Detroit Pistons.
 The New York Knicks sold Phil Jordon to the Detroit Pistons.

December 18, 1957
 Charles Eckman resigns as head coach for Fort Wayne Pistons.

December 19, 1957
 The Detroit Pistons hired Red Rocha as head coach.

December 28, 1957
 The Syracuse Nationals sold Joe Holup to the Detroit Pistons.

January 14, 1958
 The Minneapolis Lakers fired George Mikan as head coach.
 The Minneapolis Lakers hired John Kundla as head coach.

January 19, 1958
 The Philadelphia Warriors traded Walt Davis to the St. Louis Hawks for Dave Plunkett.

February 5, 1958
 The Minneapolis Lakers traded Art Spoelstra to the New York Knicks for Bo Erias and cash.

February 16, 1958
 The St. Louis Hawks traded Frank Selvy to the Minneapolis Lakers for Dick Boushka and Terry Rand.

February 18, 1958
 The Detroit Pistons waived Tom Marshall.

February 20, 1958
 The Cincinnati Royals claimed Tom Marshall on waivers from the Detroit Pistons.

April 5, 1958
 Vince Boryla resigns as head coach for New York Knicks.

April 8, 1958
 The New York Knicks hired Andrew Levane as head coach.

April 10, 1958
 John Kundla resigns as head coach for Minneapolis Lakers.

April 30, 1958
 Alex Hannum resigns as head coach for St. Louis Hawks.

May 24, 1958
 The St. Louis Hawks hired Andy Phillip as head coach.

June 10, 1958
 The Syracuse Nationals traded Dick Farley and Earl Lloyd to the Detroit Pistons for cash.

Notes
 Number of years played in the NBA prior to the draft
 Career with the franchise that drafted the player
 Never played a game for the franchise

External links
NBA Transactions at NBA.com
1957-58 NBA Transactions| Basketball-Reference.com

References

Transactions
1957-58